The men's shot put at the 2019 Asian Athletics Championships was held on 22 April.

Results

References

Shot
Shot put at the Asian Athletics Championships